Orlando Lee Scandrick (born February 10, 1987) is an American sports commentator and former American football cornerback. He played college football at Boise State University and was drafted by the Dallas Cowboys in the fifth round of the 2008 NFL Draft. He has also previously played for the Kansas City Chiefs and Philadelphia Eagles.

Early years
Scandrick was born in Torrance, California. He played high school football at Los Alamitos High School as a two way player (wide receiver and cornerback). As a senior, he had 52 receptions for 832 yards, 12 touchdowns, 54 tackles, 3 interceptions and 1,024 kickoff return yards with a touchdown. At the end of the season, he received first-team Long Beach Dream Team and first-team All-Sunset league honors.

He accepted a scholarship to play at Boise State University, where he focused on playing cornerback. Before leaving school as a junior, he started 39 of the 40 games, had 152 tackles, 3.5 sacks, five forced fumbles. In 2007, he recorded a school single-season and career record with four blocked kicks (field goals and extra points).

Professional career
Scandrick attended the NFL Scouting Combine in Indianapolis, Indiana. He completed the majority of combine drills, but opted to skip the short shuttle. Scandrick was unable to perform the bench press due to a thumb injury, but was able to help his draft stock by finishing fourth among all combine participants in the 40-yard dash. On March 3, 2008, he attended Boise State's pro day, but chose to stand on his combine performance and only run defensive back and coverage drills. At the conclusion of the pre-draft process, Scandrick was projected to be a fourth round pick. He was ranked the 16th best cornerback prospect in the draft by NFLDraftScout.com.

Dallas Cowboys
Scandrick was selected by the Dallas Cowboys in the fifth round (143rd overall) of the 2008 NFL Draft. The team traded their fifth (#155-Thomas Williams) and seventh round (#213-Chauncey Washington) draft picks to the Jacksonville Jaguars, in order to move up in the fifth round and draft him. Scandrick was the 25th cornerback selected in 2008.

On July 19, 2008, the Dallas Cowboys signed Scandrick to a four-year, $1.79 million contract. Throughout training camp, he competed against Evan Oglesby, Alan Ball, and Quincy Butler for job as the dime cornerback or for a role on special teams. Head coach Wade Phillips named Scandrick the third cornerback and starting nickelback to start the regular season, behind Anthony Henry and Mike Jenkins. Adam Jones began the season with a six-game suspension and veteran Terence Newman missed multiple games due to a groin injury.

In 2011, Scandrick signed a six-year contract with the Cowboys worth $28.2 million and $10 million in guarantees. In 2013, he passed Morris Claiborne on the depth chart and became the starter at right cornerback after the third game of the season. On December 13, he signed an additional two-year contract extension.

On August 11, 2014, the NFL announced that Scandrick would be suspended for the first four games of the season for the usage of performance-enhancing drugs. Although it was confirmed that he tested positive for MDMA, during his suspension the league revised its drug policy and his punishment was reduced to two games, by changing his violation from performance enhancing to substance abuse. He made his debut in week 3 against the St. Louis Rams.

In 2015, he had a contract holdout and missed offseason workouts before reporting on May 18. On August 25, he tore his right ACL and MCL during a training camp practice, while attempting to tackle rookie wide receiver Lucky Whitehead. He was placed on the injured reserve list on September 1.

In 2016, Scandrick played in 12 games with 10 starts, recording 46 tackles, 2 sacks,  passes defensed, one interception and 3 forced fumbles. He missed 4 games while dealing with hamstring strains.

In 2017, he missed the second game against the Denver Broncos after undergoing surgery to fix a broken hand he had in the season opener. He suffered two transverse process fractures in the twelfth game against the Washington Redskins, although he was able to return a blocked field goal for 86 yards to set up a critical touchdown. He missed the rest of the season and was placed on injured reserve on December 29. He had 11 starts, 39 tackles, 3 quarterback pressures and 7 passes defensed.

In 2018, the Cowboys opted for a youth movement and a new philosophy in the team's defensive backfield with the arrival of defensive backs/passing game coordinator Kris Richard. On March 17, Scandrick was released after 10 seasons. He finished his Cowboys career with 125 games played, 422 tackles, 11.5 sacks, 8 interceptions and 63 passes defensed.

Washington Redskins
On March 19, 2018, Scandrick signed a two-year contract with the Washington Redskins. He was released on August 14, 2018.

Kansas City Chiefs
Scandrick signed a one-year contract worth $1.5 million with the Kansas City Chiefs on August 19, 2018. He played in 15 games with seven starts, recording 44 combined tackles, a career-high 13 passes defensed, one interception, and a forced fumble.

Philadelphia Eagles
On July 27, 2019, Scandrick signed with the Philadelphia Eagles. He was released during final roster cuts on August 30, 2019. He was re-signed on September 27. In week 5 against the New York Jets, Scandrick recorded two strip sacks.  On the second one, he strip sacked Luke Falk and returned the ball for a 44-yard touchdown in the 31–6 win.  Two weeks later, Scandrick was beaten in the open field by the Cowboys' Tavon Austin for a 20 yard touchdown on a jet sweep. He was released the next day, on October 21, 2019.

NFL career statistics

References

External links

Washington Redskins bio

1987 births
Living people
People from Los Alamitos, California
American sportspeople in doping cases
Sportspeople from Orange County, California
Players of American football from California
American football cornerbacks
Boise State Broncos football players
Dallas Cowboys players
Washington Redskins players
Kansas City Chiefs players
Philadelphia Eagles players